The Reformed Presbyterian Church in Southern Africa was founded by Scottish missionaries. It was formerly known as Bantu Presbyterian Church. It became independent in 1923, and spread all over South Africa, concentrated mainly in Cape Town and Natal. Members are mainly Afrikaans and few colored people. It had 52,000 members and 100 parishes. Merged with the Uniting Presbyterian Church in Southern Africa.

References 

Presbyterian denominations in Africa
Christianity in South Africa